Family Parade is a 1936 German comedy film directed by Fritz Wendhausen and starring Ernst Dumcke, Curd Jürgens and Amanda Lindner. It was shot at the Halensee Studios in Berlin. The film's sets were designed by the art director Fritz Maurischat and Karl Weber.

Cast
 Ernst Dumcke as Graf Sven Stjernenhö
 Curd Jürgens as Graf Erik Stjernenhö
 Amanda Lindner as Reichsgräfin Jutta
 Walter Janssen as Graf Hjalmar
 Helmut Weiss as Vetter Bertel
 Hubert von Meyerinck as Vetter Max
 Herbert Hübner as Baron Barrenkrona
 Ellen Frank as Alice Barrenkrona
 Käthe Haack as Karin Bratt
 F.W. Schröder-Schrom as Knut Bratt
 Heinz Rippert as Erik Bratt
 Klaus Pohl as Graf Donnerschlag auf Riesenfels
 Richard Ludwig as Baron Greifenkreuz
 Franz Weber as Graf Löwenborg
 Annemarie Steinsieck as Gräfin Löwenborg
 Hedi Heising as Ingrid
 Ewald Wenck as Graf Güldenstjerna
 Else Ehser as Gräfin Güldenstjerna
 Franz Schönemann as Baron Thornberg
 Maria Seidler as Baronin Thornberg
 Hugo Flink as Herr Wennergren
 Olga Engl as Frau Wennergren
 Maria Krahn as Miss Grove
 Lucie Höflich as Frau Appelquist
 Willi Schaeffers as Johannsen
 Bruno Ziener as Frederik
 Otto Stoeckel as Lindström
 Erich Dunskus as 1. Geschäftsmann
 Oskar Höcker as Geschäftsmann
 Hans Henninger as Lauritz
 Paula Denk as Olga
 Eta Klingenberg as Sigrid

References

Bibliography 
 Klaus, Ulrich J. Deutsche Tonfilme: Jahrgang 1935. Klaus-Archiv, 1988.

External links 
 

1936 films
1936 comedy films
German comedy films
Films of Nazi Germany
1930s German-language films
Films directed by Fritz Wendhausen
Tobis Film films
German black-and-white films
1930s German films
Films shot at Halensee Studios